The 2011 Superleague Formula season was the fourth and final season Superleague Formula championship. The series reverted to being known simply as "Superleague Formula", with 2009's two-year sponsorship deal with Sonangol also having expired. The first race of the season was held on 5 June at Assen and was due to finish at a venue in New Zealand after 8 race weekends.

After three seasons in which the cars were run in club team colours, the 2011 season saw drivers competing in the colours of their nation, with countries adorning team names as had been set out by Team China in 2010, thus beginning a severing of the strong links the series had attempted to make by linking each team entry with a football club. As many as eight of the announced fourteen entries no longer had links with football teams.

The season ended after just two of the scheduled rounds after a number of complications, which saw tracks not being ready in time for the series, and disagreements with race organisers.

Teams and drivers
 All teams competed on Michelin tyres for the fourth season in a row.

Driver changes
Entering/Re-Entering Superleague Formula
After racing the 2010 season in Stock Car Brasil, Antônio Pizzonia returns to Superleague Formula with the Brazil entrant.
Formula Renault 3.5 Series driver Filip Salaquarda will join new Superleague Formula club, AC Sparta Prague, supported by Atech Reid Grand Prix.

Leaving Superleague Formula
 Adderly Fong and Hywel Lloyd will both move back to British Formula 3 in 2011 with Sino Vision Racing, as will Bruno Méndez, racing for Hitech Racing.
 Having contested the final race of the 2010 season with PSV Eindhoven, Esteban Guerrieri will move into Firestone Indy Lights with Sam Schmidt Motorsports.
 Máximo Cortés, Julien Jousse and James Walker will race in the Le Mans Series in 2011, having raced in Superleague Formula on different occasions in 2010.
 Narain Karthikeyan, who raced for PSV Eindhoven during much of 2010, will return to Formula One with Hispania Racing following a five-year absence from the series.
 Celso Míguez will race in the Spanish GT Championship in 2011 with Aurora Racing Team having competed in Superleague Formula at two events during 2010.
 Last year's Superleague Formula champion Davide Rigon will make the step up to the GP2 Series in 2011 with team Scuderia Coloni.

Mid-season changes
 Chris van der Drift switched to the Formula Renault 3.5 Series for the start of 2011 but returned to Superleague Formula for round two in Zolder. Max Wissel rejoined the series with new entrant South Korea, and Mikhail Aleshin joined the other new entrant, Russia, racing in Superleague Formula for the first time. Robert Doornbos took over from Duncan Tappy in the championship-leading Japan car, with Tappy moving to the Galatasaray car to replace Andy Soucek, who in turn replaces María de Villota at Atlético de Madrid.

2011 Schedule
 Superleague Formula announced its full 2011 calendar on May 2, which saw the championship embark on a "Nations Cup", with races on four different continents this season in 8 rounds. For the first time, races were scheduled to be held in Russia, Brazil (two races), the Middle East and New Zealand. The Russian round, due to be held at the newly built Smolensk Ring, was later cancelled. The Middle East round was later replaced by a round in South Korea and a second round in China was added to replace the Russian round. The two rounds in Brazil were cancelled after apparent issues with the track in Goiânia. The series finale in New Zealand was later cancelled. The "Nations Cup" branding also had to be abandoned due to issues with naming rights which the series was still looking to resolve.
 With the announcement of the calendar, it was confirmed that each round was known as a 'Grand Prix'.
 The SF World Feed commentators at Zolder were Andrew Coley and Earl Bamber.

Race calendar and results

Cancelled races

Test calendar and results
 There was a two-day pre-season test session at Spain's Circuito Monteblanco on 9–10 December 2010.
 The Circuito de Navarra in Spain was due to host a two-day test on 30–31 August 2011. However, the scheduled event was cancelled, without an explanatory announcement.

Championship standings

Race 1 and 2 points

Super Final points

 New for 2011 was the alteration that the top 8 points-scorers from the weekend would compete in the Super Final, in contrast to 2010 where only the top 6 would qualify.

References

External links
 Superleague Formula Official Website
 V12 Racing: Independent Superleague Formula Fansite Magazine
 Superleague Formula at thenewsmarket.com

 
Superleague Formula season
Superleague Formula season
Superleague Formula